Greggmar Orial Swift (born 16 February 1991 in Bridgetown) is a sprint hurdler from Barbados. Greggmar attended Indiana State University, where he studied Insurance & Risk Management and was a Five-time All-American in the 60-meter and 110-meter hurdles. He competed in the 110 metres hurdles at the 2012 Summer Olympics.
He qualified for the 2015 Pan-Am Games with his gold medal win at the Universiade.

Personal bests
110 m hurdles outdoor: 13.28 s (wind: +0.8 m/s) – Toronto, Canada, United States, 24 July 2015
60 m hurdles indoor: 7.54 s – New York (Armory), NY, United States, February 2015 NR

International competitions

1: Did not finish in the final.

References

External links

Tilastopaja biography

1991 births
Living people
Sportspeople from Bridgetown
Barbadian male hurdlers
Olympic athletes of Barbados
Athletes (track and field) at the 2012 Summer Olympics
Athletes (track and field) at the 2016 Summer Olympics
Commonwealth Games competitors for Barbados
Athletes (track and field) at the 2014 Commonwealth Games
World Athletics Championships athletes for Barbados
Athletes (track and field) at the 2015 Pan American Games
Athletes (track and field) at the 2019 Pan American Games
Pan American Games competitors for Barbados
Indiana State Sycamores men's track and field athletes
Universiade medalists in athletics (track and field)
Central American and Caribbean Games bronze medalists for Barbados
Competitors at the 2014 Central American and Caribbean Games
Universiade medalists for Barbados
Central American and Caribbean Games medalists in athletics
Medalists at the 2015 Summer Universiade